Paul Burke (born 1 October 1982) is a former Scotland Club XV international rugby union player, previously with Glasgow Warriors and Ayr.

Rugby Union career

Amateur career
He played for Ayr. While with Ayr he won the Scottish Premiership and the Scottish Cup.

He then played for Marr. While at Marr he won the 2010–11 season, he then won a run of four successive league title wins which promoted the club from the sixth to the second tier of Scottish club rugby for the 2014–15 season. They were promoted to the Scottish Premiership in the 2016-17.

Professional career
He played for Glasgow Warriors in their pre-season matches against Sale Sharks, Clermont Auvergne and  La Rochelle.

He made his competitive debut for the Warriors in their Celtic League match against Cardiff Blues at Firhill Stadium on 19 February 2010. He is Warrior Number 180.

International career
He has been capped by Scotland Club XV.

Coaching career
He has been Assistant Coach at Marr.

Management career
Burke has managed various gyms in the Bannatyne group;- in Ayr, Inverness and Dunfermline.

He has a degree in Sports Science from the University of the West of Scotland.

References

1982 births
Living people
Ayr RFC players
Glasgow Warriors players
Marr RFC players
Rugby union players from South Ayrshire
Scotland Club XV international rugby union players
Scottish rugby union players
Rugby union flankers